Glenea rubricollis is a species of beetle in the family Cerambycidae. It was described by Frederick William Hope in 1842, originally under the genus Colobothea. It is known from Vietnam and India.

References

rubricollis
Beetles described in 1842